To be righteous is to act in an upright, moral, virtuous manner.

Righteous may also refer to:

 Righteous (album), an album by DAG
 "Righteous (City Pain)", a song from that album
 "Righteous" (song), a song by Juice Wrld from the album Legends Never Die
 "Righteous", a song by Joe Satriani from the album What Happens Next

See also
The Righteous (disambiguation)
Righteousness